Massive retaliation, also known as  a massive response or massive deterrence, is a military doctrine and nuclear strategy in which a state commits itself to retaliate in much greater force in the event of an attack.

Strategy

In the event of an attack from an aggressor, a state would massively retaliate by using a force disproportionate to the size of the attack.

The aim of massive retaliation is to deter another state from attacking first. For such a strategy to work, it must be made public knowledge to all possible aggressors. The aggressor also must believe that the state announcing the policy has the ability to maintain second-strike capability in the event of an attack. It must also believe that the defending state is willing to go through with the deterrent threat, which would likely involve the use of nuclear weapons on a massive scale.

Massive retaliation works on the same principles as mutual assured destruction (MAD), with the important caveat that even a minor conventional attack on a nuclear state could conceivably result in all-out nuclear retaliation. However, when massive retaliation became policy, there was no MAD yet since the Soviet Union lacked second-strike capability throughout the 1950s.

History
The idea of "massive retaliation" was first formally articulated by the Eisenhower administration Secretary of State John Foster Dulles in a speech on January 12, 1954.

Dulles stated:We need allies and collective security. Our purpose is to make these relations more effective, less costly. This can be done by placing more reliance on deterrent power and less dependence on local defensive power... Local defense will always be important. But there is no local defense which alone will contain the mighty land power of the Communist world. Local defenses must be reinforced by the further deterrent of massive retaliatory power. A potential aggressor must know that he cannot always prescribe battle conditions that suit him.At the time, Dulles's speech was controversial. Dulles did not explicitly used the words "massive retaliation;" instead, he spoke about relation as a much less threatening term. In his speech, Dulles also stated that "local defense must be reinforced by the further deterrent of massive retaliatory power". It is in that quote that the idea of massive retaliation being articulated is seen, but the use of the specific words are absent. Dulles never used the exact words because the term "massive retaliation" has an aggressive tone and caused much negative feedback from the public, which deemed it as a controversial subject. Dulles speech in 1954 was what formed the basis for the term massive retaliation, which would back up any conventional defense against conventional attacks with a possible massive retaliatory attack involving nuclear weapons.

One of the primary ideas that makes up the term "massive retaliation" is to make known to the enemy that the degree of retaliation is not confined by the magnitude of the attack. This would feasibly strike fear into the opposing side preventing any further or future attacks from happening. The U.S. has always been a national power and the idea of what a full blow retaliation attack could do to an opposing country has kept many hesitant to prod the U.S. into a state of attack.

It was made clear by the end of Dulles speech that he and many other government officials viewed the "reactive measures" as a tactic of the past that would do no good for the U.S. in the near future, and that the dependence on these measures could actually lead to the destruction of the U.S. The primary goal of "massive retaliation" was a type of preventative measure that was seen as a necessary step to prevent the U.S. from getting into any more wars that would cost American lives. Dulles speech aroused feelings of anger and skepticism from Americans listening from home. With the World War II being newly ended, many Americans were still fearful of the possibility of a nuclear war and this caused skepticism in a tactic that could provoke just that. The ultimate goal of introducing a tactic such as massive retaliation by powerful government officials such as Dulles and Eisenhower was to provide a military tactic that would sustain peace and prevail against communism.

Criticism
Two members of the RAND Corporation criticized the doctrine as too aggressive and identical to the first strike. Herman Kahn stressed that many military planners adhering to the "splendid first strike" believed that if the Soviets did provoke the U.S. then they should launch a large strike at "a time and place of our choosing." This is "the massive retaliation theory as enunciated by ... Dulles."

Similarly, Bernard Brodie noted that Dulles' doctrine "reflected a characteristically military dissatisfaction, one made familiar previously in the MacArthur hearings." It represented nothing new about the defense of America or Europe but it was startling because it seemed to reject restraint symbolized by Korea for areas of not vital interests. In the event of a similar Korean incident, the Dulles's doctrine implied much more than bombing the North Korean armies with thermonuclear weapons. We seem to be resolved to launch "a full-fledged strategic nuclear bombing attack on China!" And "we should probably have to include the Soviet Union as well." The Dulles's doctrine, Brodie concludes, "of course, is a preventive war, save that we have waited for an excuse, a provocation," and hence of time not entirely of our choosing.

Effects

In theory, as the Soviet Union had no desire to provoke an all-out nuclear attack, the policy of massive response likely deterred any ambitions it would have had on Western Europe. Although the United States and NATO bloc would be hard-pressed in a conventional conflict with the Warsaw Pact forces if a conventional war were to occur, the massive response doctrine prevented the Soviets from advancing for fear that a nuclear attack would have been made upon the Soviet Union in response to a conventional attack.

It can, however, be argued that aside from raising tensions in an already strained relationship with the Soviet bloc, massive retaliation had few practical effects at that time. Before the development of the US nuclear triad, the threat of massive retaliation was hard to make credible, and was inflexible in response to foreign policy issues, as everyday challenges of foreign policy could not have been dealt with using a massive nuclear strike. In fact, the Soviet Union took many minor military actions that would have necessitated the use of nuclear weapons under a strict reading of the massive retaliation doctrine.

A massive retaliation doctrine, as with any nuclear strategy based on the principle of mutually assured destruction and as an extension the second-strike capability needed to form a retaliatory attack, encouraged the opponent to perform a massive counterforce first strike. This, if successful, would cripple the defending state's retaliatory capacity and render a massive retaliation strategy useless. Subsequent developments such as thermonuclear warhead miniaturization, accurate silo-based ICBMs, accurate submarine-launched ballistic missiles, stealth technology applied to cruise missiles, and GPS munitions guidance have resulted in a much more credible second-strike capability for some technologically advanced nations.

Still, if both sides of a conflict adopt the same stance of massive response, it may result in unlimited escalation (a "nuclear spasm"), each believing that the other will back down after the first round of retaliation. Both problems are not unique to massive retaliation, but to nuclear deterrence as a whole.

Policy shift

In 1957, three years after his announcement of massive retaliation, Dulles compromised his doctrine. In recent years, he wrote in Foreign Affairs, there has been no alternative to massive retaliation, but now the response can be confined to limited targets. Historian of the Cold War, Marc Trachtenberg, finds that since the very announcement, Dulles was moving toward the flexible response. Nevertheless, Eisenhower until the end of his term continued to dismiss out of hand the very idea of restraint in general war. In 1959, he said: "Once we become involved in a nuclear exchange with the Soviet Union, we could not stop until we had finished off the enemy." There was no point to talking about "negotiating a settlement in the midst of the war," no alternative, therefore, to hitting "the Russians as hard as we could."

President John F. Kennedy abandoned the policy of massive retaliation during the Cuban Missile Crisis in favor of flexible response. The Soviet nuclear MRBMs in Cuba had very short flight time to their US targets and could have crippled the SAC bomber bases before the aircraft could take off and launch massive retaliation against the Soviet Union. Under the Kennedy Administration, the United States adopted a more flexible policy in an attempt to avert nuclear war if the Soviets did not cooperate with American demands. If the United States' only announced military reaction to any Soviet incursion (no matter how small) was a massive nuclear strike, and the U.S. didn't follow through, then the Soviets would assume that the United States would never attack. This would have made the Soviet Union far more bold in its military ventures against U.S. allies and would probably have resulted in a full-scale nuclear war. Thomas Schelling's deterrence theory discusses this more sharply: "signalling", or the use of threats internationally to deter an enemy from an attack or to make demands. If signals weren't being properly addressed by the Soviet Union, if the threats were not intimidating or coercing them to remove the missiles from Cuba, then the Soviet Union would simply not have believed that the U.S.'s policy of massive retaliation held any water. By having other, more flexible policies to deal with aggressive Soviet actions, the U.S. could opt out of a nuclear strike and take less damaging actions to rectify the problem without losing face in the international community.

Another reason for this was the development of a Soviet second strike capability, in the form of silo-based ICBMs and later SLBMs.

Retaliation plan for North Korean nuclear threat 

In 2015, the United States and South Korea came to a new agreement regarding the handling of North Korean nuclear threats. The agreement gave South Korea both options to prevent a missile strike, and the ability to strike back quickly with force.

The strategy is known as Massive Punishment and Retaliation, and in this, a quick retaliatory strike would be carried out on North Korean officials. This Korean Massive Punishment and Retaliation plan brought back the deterrence strategy previously used. The United States-South Korea partnership understands the implications of a preemptive strike, and put efforts into defense and response.

The United States placed a Terminal High Altitude Area Defense (THAAD) in South Korea to protect the country from missile strikes from the North. This defense system is capable of intercepting ballistic missiles of all ranges. The missile defense system coupled with the plan of a massive retaliatory strike has given South Korea a better sense of security against the North. The threat of a massive retaliation from the South was a deterrent for the North.

Following the installation of the THAAD in South Korea and the election of President Donald Trump in 2016, the policy of massive retaliation was growing. In 2017, North Korean missile tests and threats from Supreme Leader Kim Jong-un further increased tensions. Following a North Korean threat of an attack on the United States military base in Guam, it prompted a response from President Trump in which he stated:“They will be met with fire and fury like the world has never seen. He has been very threatening ... and as I said they will be met with fire, fury and frankly power, the likes of which this world has never seen before.”

- Donald J. Trump. August, 2018.      This threat of massive retaliation, and the president's stated policy of applying “maximum pressure” on the North Koreans was soon followed by a summit between the two leaders. The focus of this summit was the end goal of ending the testing of nuclear weapons in North Korea. With the threat of massive retaliation from both the United States and South Korea still looming, the summit initially seemed to have a positive response, with the testing of nuclear devices coming to a halt. This however was followed by fallout, as it was believed that there was an increase in production of weapons following the summit. This ultimately ended with no advancement to denuclearization in North Korea, and no preemptive or retaliatory strikes by either side.

See also

 Dead Hand (nuclear war)
 Cold War
 Deterrence theory
 Essentials of Post–Cold War Deterrence
 Game theory
 National missile defense
 NSC 162/2
 Nuclear peace
 Peace through strength
 Samson Option
 Weapon of mass destruction
 Nuclear Deterrence Operations Service Medal

References

Citations
 Watry, David M. Diplomacy at the Brink: Eisenhower, Churchill, and Eden in the Cold War. Baton Rouge: Louisiana State University Press, 2014.

External links
 Massive Retaliation at the Nuclear Files

Cold War policies
Cold War terminology
Military doctrines
Nuclear strategy
Nuclear warfare